Arianne Angeli Bautista (born September 1, 1993) is a Filipina commercial model, actress, and former host of GMA Network. She is currently a freelance artist since 2019.

Early life
Arianne Bautista was born and raised in Quezon City. She studied in La Consolacion College Caloocan during her grade school and high school years. She graduated Bachelor of Science in Tourism from the University of Santo Tomas in 2010. She started as a commercial model while she was still in her senior years but then eventually started to enter showbiz in 2013. Her first TV appearance was in ABS-CBN's show Juan dela Cruz where she played a Secretary role. She signed a contract under GMA Artist Center the following year. For her first stint, she was chosen to be the best friend of the antagonist, Wynwyn Marquez, in Kambal Sirena in 2014. Bautista was later signed as one among the guest hosts of Wowowin, joining Rhian Ramos, Denise Barbacena, Gabbi Garcia and Ashley Ortega and show host Willie Revillame.

TV projects
Bautista has signed for a number of TV appearances with GMA Network. This includes appearances in GMA Network-produced TV series as well as the sitcom Bubble Gang, and appearances in Wowowin as guest host and Laff, Camera, Action! as main host. Arianne appeared and rose to fame as one of the cast in Ika-6 na Utos as Selma, a supportive friend and accomplice of Georgia. During 2019, she became a freelancer and was able to make an appearance in her former home network, ABS-CBN, via Minute to Win It.

Filmography

Television

See also
 Coleen Perez
 Ryza Cenon
 Toni Gonzaga
 Sunshine Dizon

References

External links
 

1993 births
Living people
Filipino female models
Actresses from Metro Manila
People from Quezon City
GMA Network personalities